Pedro Damián Araya Toro (born 23 January 1942), known as Pedro Araya, is a Chilean former football player who played as a right winger.

Playing career
Toro represented the Chile national team at the 1966 World Cup, and played all three matches for the squad. Between 1964 and 1972, he was capped 65 times and scored 14 goals for his country.

A very skillful and fast player, Araya played as a classic "number 7" (the shirt number associated with an "outside" forward). Along with Campos and Carlos Leonel Sanchez formed the great offensive triplet of the 'Ballet Azul'. His career also continues in Mexico playing for the San Luis de Potosi and Atlas de Guadalajara (even in a friendly it was a goal at Real Madrid at the Santiago Bernabeu himself).

In America's Cup in Montevideo, 1967, Araya was called by the Uruguayan press: The Chilean Garrincha.

Coaching career
He graduated as a football manager in Mexico and coached Atlético Potosino in the 1987–88 season, with his compatriot Luis Cholo Castro in the squad.

Back in Chile, he started an eponymous football academy based in Nebraska neighborhood in Lo Barnechea commune.

Personal life
Araya Toro married a woman from San Luis Potosí, Mexico, where he would move after retiring from football.

References

External links

Pedro Araya at PartidosdelaRoja 
FIFA statistics

1942 births
Living people
Chilean people of Basque descent
Footballers from Santiago
Chilean footballers
Chilean expatriate footballers
Chile international footballers
1966 FIFA World Cup players
1967 South American Championship players
Universidad de Chile footballers
San Luis F.C. players
Atlas F.C. footballers
Chilean Primera División players
Liga MX players
Chilean expatriate sportspeople in Mexico
Expatriate footballers in Mexico
Association football wingers
Chilean football managers
Chilean expatriate football managers
Liga MX managers
Expatriate football managers in Mexico